The 1907 Missouri Tigers football team was an American football team that represented the University of Missouri in the Missouri Valley Conference (MVC) during the 1907 college football season. The team compiled an overall record of 7–2 record with a mark of 1–1 against conference opponents, placed fourth in the MVC, and outscored all opponents by a combined total of 278 to 41. W. J. Monilaw was the head coach for the second of three seasons. The team played its home games at Rollins Field in Columbia, Missouri.

Schedule

References

Missouri
Missouri Tigers football seasons
Missouri Tigers football